Didac Pérez Minarro (b. Barcelona, 7 September 1981) is a former professional tennis player from Spain.

Career
Perez won his only ATP Tour match in the 2002 Open SEAT Godó, which was held in the city of his birth, Barcelona. He defeated world number 52 Fernando Meligeni.

In the 2002 French Open, his only Grand Slam appearance, Perez lost in the first round to countryman Feliciano López, in five sets.

Challenger titles

Singles: (3)

Doubles: (1)

References

1981 births
Living people
Spanish male tennis players
Tennis players from Barcelona
Tennis players from Catalonia